Rhox homeobox family, member 2 also known as paired-like homeobox protein (PEPP-2) is a protein in humans that is encoded by the RHOXF2 gene.

RHOXF2 contains a glutamine-rich N-terminus, a homeodomain, and a proline-rich C-terminus.

References